Washington County is a county in the Commonwealth of Pennsylvania. As of the 2020 census, the population was 209,349. Its county seat is Washington.

Washington County is part of the Pittsburgh, PA Metropolitan Statistical Area.

The county is home to Washington County Airport, three miles (5 km) southwest of Washington.

History
The county was created on March 28, 1781, from part of Westmoreland County. The city and county were both named after American Revolutionary War leader George Washington, who eventually became the first President of the United States.  The town of Charleroi got its name from the Belgian city of Charleroi. There lived many Belgian immigrants in the Monongahela area at the end of the 19th century, some of whom were glass makers.

Geography

Surrounding counties
Beaver County (north)
Allegheny County (NNE-northeast)
Westmoreland County (East-northeast)
Fayette County (East-southeast)
Greene County (south)
Marshall County, West Virginia (southwest)
Ohio County, West Virginia (west)
Brooke County, West Virginia (west)
Hancock County, West Virginia (northwest)

Major highways

Washington County's Flag

Design
The flag of Washington County, Pennsylvania consists of a light blue background with the county's seal in the middle. The seal consists of the county courthouse, a covered bridge, an Indian, and an early settler. This montage has the words "Historical Washington County" and "1781" inside a circle.

History

On October 7, 1977, Washington County Bicentennial Commission chairman Charles Chattaway and member Charlotte K. Lane showed a design for a county flag. The flag had been the general idea of Raymond E. Dunlevy. The design of that flag was the county seal in the upper left hand corner without the circle and words "Historical Washington County" in the color yellow. The seal is in a vertical purple rectangle that goes fully down the flag. That purple stripe takes up one fourth of the flag. The rest of the flag has a sky blue stripe that goes along the full top of the flag and takes up almost half going down. Below that is a thin green line. Below that line is a thin sky blue line. The rest of the flag going down is green. They did not end up using this flag. They used the one that is in use today.

Climate 
Washington County has a humid continental climate (Köppen Dfb), with warm summers and cold, snowy winters.

Demographics

As of the census of 2000, there were 202,897 people, 81,130 households, and 56,060 families residing in the county. The population density was 237 people per square mile (91/km2). There were 87,267 housing units at an average density of 102 per square mile (39/km2). The racial makeup of the county was 95.27% White, 3.26% Black or African American, 0.09% Native American, 0.36% Asian, 0.02% Pacific Islander, 0.19% from other races, and 0.82% from two or more races. 0.58% of the population were Hispanic or Latino of any race. 18.3% were of German, 17.2% Italian, 10.6% Irish, 8.6% English, 7.9% Polish and 6.2% American ancestry.

There were 81,130 households, out of which 28.40% had children under the age of 18 living with them, 55.20% were married couples living together, 10.30% had a female householder with no husband present, and 30.90% were non-families. 27.00% of all households were made up of individuals, and 13.20% had someone living alone who was 65 years of age or older. The average household size was 2.44 and the average family size was 2.96.

In the county, the population was spread out, with 22.20% under the age of 18, 7.70% from 18 to 24, 27.20% from 25 to 44, 25.00% from 45 to 64, and 17.90% who were 65 years of age or older. The median age was 41 years. For every 100 females there were 92.40 males. For every 100 females age 18 and over, there were 89.00 males.

As of 1800, this county was largely settled by people of Scot-Irish heritage because "prime lands" were already taken by the Germans and the Quakers.

2020 Census

Government and politics

|}

The County of Washington is governed by a three-member publicly elected commission. The three commissioners serve in both executive and legislative capacities. By state law, the commission must have a minority party guaranteeing a political split on the commission. Each term is for four years.

The three current commissioners for Washington County are Lawrence Maggi (Democrat), Diana Irey (Republican), and Nick Sherman (Republican).

Maggi was the Democratic nominee for Pennsylvania's 18th congressional district against Republican incumbent Tim Murphy in 2012. Maggi lost to Murphy and earned only 36 percent of the vote. Irey was the Republican candidate for Pennsylvania's 12th congressional district and lost to the late Democratic incumbent John Murtha in the 2006 election.

The Washington County Court of Common Pleas, the Twenty-Seventh Judicial District of Pennsylvania, is the state trial court, sitting in and for Washington County.  It serves as the court of original jurisdiction for the region.  There are five judges, which the county's citizens elect to ten year terms, under the laws of the Commonwealth.  The President Judge is Katherine B. Emery; she is the most senior member of the bench.  Judges of the court are:

 John F. DiSalle, P.J.
 Gary Gilman, J.
 Valarie Costanzo, J. 
 Michael J. Lucas, J.
 Traci McDonald-Kemp, J.
 Jesse Pettit, J. 
Additionally, magisterial district judges (MDJs) serve throughout the county to hear traffic citations, issue warrants, and decide minor civil matters.

The Democratic Party has been historically dominant in county-level politics and national politics between 1932 and 2004, only voting Republican for president in Richard Nixon's 1972 landslide victory over George McGovern.
However, like much of Appalachian coal country, Washington has trended strongly Republican in recent years. In 2000, Democrat Al Gore won 53% of the vote and Republican George W. Bush won 44%. In 2004, Democrat John Kerry received 50.14% of the vote and Bush received 49.57% a difference of 552 votes. In 2008, Republican John McCain won 51% to Democrat Barack Obama's 46% and each of the three state row office winners carried Washington County.

Voter registration
As of November 7, 2022, there are 144,520 registered voters in the county. Registered Republicans have a plurality of 67,881 registered voters, compared to 58,613 registered Democrats, 13,861 registered non-affiliated voters, and 4,165 voters registered to other parties.

County row offices
Clerk of Courts, Brenda Davis, Republican
Controller, April Sloane, Republican
Coroner, Timothy Warco, Democrat
District Attorney, Jason Walsh, Republican
Prothonotary, Laura Hough, Republican
Recorder of Deeds, Carrie Perrell, Republican
Register of Wills, James Roman, Republican
Sheriff, Anthony Andronas, Republican
Treasurer, Tom Flickinger, Republican
Public Safety Director, Gerald R. Coleman, Independent

State representatives
Josh Kail, Republican, 15th district
Mike Puskaric, Republican, 39th district
Natalie Mihalek, Republican, 40th district
Jason Ortitay, Republican, 46th district
Tim O'Neal, Republican, 48th district
Bud Cook, Republican, 49th district
Pam Snyder, Democrat, 50th district

State senator
Camera Bartolotta, Republican, 46th district

United States Representatives
Guy Reschenthaler, Republican, 14th district

United States Senators
 John Fetterman, Democrat
 Bob Casey, Jr., Democrat

Landmarks and events

Pony League baseball was founded in Washington County in 1951 for 13 and 14 year old boys and its headquarters are located here. As of 2016, more than a half-million youth in the U.S. and 40 other nations participate. The televised Pony League World Series held annually in August at Washington's Lew Hays Pony Field attracts teenage teams from around the world.

Washington County is also the home of the Pennsylvania Trolley Museum.  Washington County is also famous for its Rock Shelters at Meadowcroft Village, which are one of the best preserved and oldest Pre-Clovis Native American dwellings in the country.  The county has 21 covered bridges still standing.

The Whiskey Rebellion culminated in Washington. The home of David Bradford, one of the rebellion leaders, is located in Washington and is a national landmark. Just a couple blocks away is the F. Julius LeMoyne House, which serves as the headquarters of the Washington County Historical Society.

Washington County is the home of the first crematory in the United States.

In 1981, the Pennsylvania Historical and Museum Commission installed a historical marker noting the historic importance of the county.

Education

Colleges and universities
 California University of Pennsylvania in California Borough
 Community College of Allegheny County Washington branch in North Franklin Township
 Washington & Jefferson College in the City of Washington and East Washington Borough
 Waynesburg University- Southpointe Center Campus in Cecil Township.

Public school districts

 Avella Area School District
 Bentworth School District
 Bethlehem-Center School District
 Brownsville Area School District (also in Fayette County)
 Burgettstown Area School District
 California Area School District
 Canon-McMillan School District
 Charleroi School District
 Chartiers-Houston School District
 Fort Cherry School District (also in Allegheny County)
 McGuffey School District
 Peters Township School District
 Ringgold School District
 Trinity Area School District
 Washington School District

Served by
Intermediate Unit 1 – Coal Center
Mon Valley Career and Technology Center – Charleroi
Western Area Career and Technology Center – Canonsburg

Private schools

Calvary Chapel Christian School – Fredericktown	
Central Christian Academy – Houston
Children's School of Washington
Cornerstone Mennonite School – Burgettstown
Faith Christian School of Washington – Washington
First Love Christian Academy High – Washington
Goddard School – Venetia
Gwens Montessori School Inc – Washington
Hickory Christian School – Hickory
Huntington Learning Center – McMurray
John F Kennedy School – Washington
Kinder Care Learning Centers
Lakeview Christian Academy – Bridgeville
Madonna Catholic Regional School – Monongahela
Mel Blount Leadership Academy – Claysville
NHS School – Ellsworth
Rainbows End Learning Center – Washington
St Francis Children's School – Beallsville
Tri-State Christian School – Burgettstown

Libraries

Avella Area Library Center
Bentleyville Public Library
Burgettstown Community Library
California Public Library
Chartiers-Houston Community Library
Citizens Library – Washington
Donora Public Library
Frank Sarris Public Library – Canonsburg
Fredericktown Area Public Library
Heritage Public Library – McDonald
John K Tener Library – Charleroi
Marianna Community Public Library
Monongahela Area Library
Peters Township Public Library
Washington County Library System

Hospitals
 Canonsburg General Hospital, part of West Penn Allegheny Health System in North Strabane Township
 Monongahela Valley Hospital in Carroll Township
 The Washington Hospital in the City of Washington

Communities

Under Pennsylvania law, there are four types of incorporated municipalities: cities, boroughs, townships, and, in at most two cases, towns. The following cities, boroughs and townships are located in Washington County:

Cities
Monongahela
Washington (county seat)

Boroughs

Allenport
Beallsville
Bentleyville
Burgettstown
California
Canonsburg
Centerville
Charleroi
Claysville
Coal Center
Cokeburg
Deemston
Donora
Dunlevy
East Washington
Elco
Ellsworth
Finleyville
Green Hills
Houston
Long Branch
Marianna
McDonald (partly in Allegheny County)
Midway
New Eagle
North Charleroi
Roscoe
Speers
Stockdale
Twilight
West Brownsville
West Middletown

Townships

Amwell
Blaine
Buffalo
Canton
Carroll
Cecil
Chartiers
Cross Creek
Donegal
East Bethlehem
East Finley
Fallowfield
Hanover
Hopewell
Independence
Jefferson
Morris
Mount Pleasant
North Bethlehem
North Franklin
North Strabane
Nottingham
Peters
Robinson
Smith
Somerset
South Franklin
South Strabane
Union
West Bethlehem
West Finley
West Pike Run

Census-designated places
Census-designated places are geographical areas designated by the U.S. Census Bureau for the purposes of compiling demographic data. They are not actual jurisdictions under Pennsylvania law.

Aaronsburg
Atlasburg
Avella
Baidland
Bulger
Cecil-Bishop
Cross Creek
Eighty Four
Elrama
Fredericktown 
Gastonville
Hendersonville
Hickory
Joffre
Langeloth
Lawrence
McGovern
McMurray
Meadowlands
Millsboro
Muse
Paris
Slovan
Southview
Taylorstown
Thompsonville
Van Voorhis
West Alexander
Westland
Wickerham Manor-Fisher
Wolfdale
Wylandville

Unincorporated communities

 Amity
 Blainsburg
 Condit Crossing
 Cool Valley
 Courtney
 Cracker Jack
 Daisytown
 Fallowfield
 Florence
 Frogtown
 Gambles
 Glyde
 Good Intent
 Hazel Kirk
 Laboratory
 Log Pile
 Lover
 Manifold
 Murdocksville
 McAdams
 North Fredericktown
 Old Concord
 P and W Patch
 Prosperity
 Raccoon
 Richeyville
 Scenery Hill
 Studa
 Venetia
 Vestaburg

Former communities
Allen Township
Bethlehem Township
East Pike Run Township
Granville
Pike Run
Pike Run Township
Smallwood
South Canonsburg (annexed to Canonsburg in 1911)

Population ranking
The population ranking of the following table is based on the 2010 census of Washington County.

† county seat

Notable people

John Alexander Anderson, born in Washington County, United States Congressman from Kansas
Jonathan Arnold, brother-in-law of Gen. Stonewall Jackson.
Kurt Angle (born 1968), resided in Canonsburg, Olympic gold medalist and Professional wrestler
James G. Blaine (1830–1893), native of West Brownsville, United States Secretary of State, Speaker of the House of Representatives, and 1884 Republican presidential nominee
David Bradford, born in Maryland 1760 and resided in Washington, early deputy attorney-general for Washington County, became a leader in the Whiskey Rebellion challenging the nascent United States federal government
 Alexander G. Clark (1826–1891), born in Washington County, "The Colored Orator of the West", Minister to Liberia 1890–1891
William J. Carson (1840–1913), Civil War Medal of Honor recipient, 1863
Perry Como (1912–2001), native of Canonsburg, recording artist and television performer
Mitch Daniels (born 1949), native of Monongahela, former Governor of Indiana, current president of Purdue University
iJustine (born 1984), YouTube personality and actress
Alexander Fulton (unknown-died ca. 1818), founder of Alexandria, Louisiana
Ken Griffey Jr. (born 1969), native of Donora, Major League Baseball player
Ken Griffey Sr. (born 1950), native of Donora, Major League Baseball player
John Guzik (1936–2012), football player
Joseph Hardy (born 1924), former resident of Eighty Four, philanthropist, former CEO and founder of 84 Lumber
Pete Henry (1897–1952), NFL player/coach, member of Pro Football Hall of Fame.
Shirley Jones (born 1934), native of Charleroi, best known for her role as the mother of the Partridge Family and winning an Academy Award.
Francis Julius LeMoyne (1798–1879) abolitionist and pioneer of cremation in the United States.
Jonathan Letterman (1824–1872), native of Canonsburg, Father of Battlefield Medicine and Civil War surgeon
William Henry Letterman (1832–1881), native of Canonsburg, co-founder of the Phi Kappa Psi fraternity, surgeon, and brother of Jonathan Letterman
Marvin Lewis (born 1958), native of McDonald, National Football League player, coach
Jay Livingston (1915–2001), native of McDonald, Oscar-winning songwriter
William Holmes McGuffey (1800–1873), native of the western side of the county, famous educator and writer of McGuffey's Eclectic Readers – one of America's first text books
John F. McJunkin (1830–1883), Iowa Attorney General
John H. Mitchell (1835–1905), United States Senator, participant in original dispute in landmark Supreme Court case Pennoyer v. Neff
Joe Montana (born 1956), native of Monongahela, National Football League player
Stan Musial (1920–2013), native of Donora, Major League Baseball player

Dave Pahanish (born 1971),Peters Township, Songwriter, Songwriter, Country Music songwriter for Keith Urban, Tim McGraw, Toby Keith, and Jimmy Wayne

Deborah Jeane Palfrey (1956–2008), native of Charleroi, "The D.C. Madam"
John Walker Rankin (1823–1869), Iowa state senator
David Redick (died 1805), Vice-President (Lt. Governor) of Pennsylvania for three weeks in 1788; surveyor—laid out the town of Washington.
Kurt Schottenheimer (born 1949), native of McDonald, National Football League coach
Marty Schottenheimer (1943–2021), native of McDonald, National Football League player, coach
Paul Shannon (1909–1990), radio and television personality
Bobby Vinton (born 1935), native of Canonsburg, recording artist
Bob West (born 1956), native of Finleyville, voice actor best known for Barney & Friends
Joseph Ruggles Wilson (1822–1903), graduate of Jefferson College (subsequently W&J), Presbyterian minister, father of Pres. Woodrow Wilson
Bud Yorkin (1926–2015), American film and television producer, director, writer and actor.
Christopher Rankin (1788-1826), member of the U.S. House of Representatives for Mississippi's at-large district, namesake of Rankin County

See also
National Register of Historic Places listings in Washington County, Pennsylvania

References

External links

Washington County Web Site
History & Genealogy in Washington County, PA
History of Townships in Washington County, PA
History of Washington County, Pennsylvania
Citizens of Washington County (Deaths and Obituaries)

 
1781 establishments in Pennsylvania
Pittsburgh metropolitan area
Populated places established in 1781
Counties of Appalachia